Serhiy Anatoliyevich Serhieiev (also Serkan Atasay, ; born March 11, 1970) is a Ukrainian-born Turkish swimmer, who specialized in butterfly and individual medley events. He is a three-time Olympian (1996, 2004, and 2008), a multiple-time Ukrainian champion, and a five-time Turkish record holder. He is also a member of Fenerbahçe Swimming.

Atasay's Olympic debut came as a member of the Ukrainian team at the 1996 Summer Olympics in Atlanta. At that event he placed 23rd in the 200m individual medley with a time of 2:06.30.

Eight years later, Atasay qualified again for the 200m individual medley by clearing a FINA B-cut of 2:03.01 at the Ukrainian Open Championships in Kyiv. Swimming in heat four, he edged out Barbados' Bradley Ally to take a third spot and 22nd overall by 0.03 of a second in 2:03.26.

At the 2008 Summer Olympics in Beijing, Atasay, under a different name, represented Turkey as Serkan Atasay. He qualified for the third straight time in the 200m individual medley by achieving a FINA B-standard entry time of 2:04.56 from the Acropolis Grand Prix in Athens, Greece. He competed against six other swimmers in the second heat, including two-time Olympian Miguel Molina of the Philippines. Atasay came sixth. Atasay failed to advance into the semi-finals, as he placed 42nd overall in the preliminary heats.

References

External links
NBC 2008 Olympics profile

1970 births
Living people
Turkish male butterfly swimmers
Ukrainian male swimmers
Olympic swimmers of Turkey
Olympic swimmers of Ukraine
Swimmers at the 1996 Summer Olympics
Swimmers at the 2004 Summer Olympics
Swimmers at the 2008 Summer Olympics
Male medley swimmers
Fenerbahçe swimmers
Sportspeople from Zaporizhzhia
Ukrainian emigrants to Turkey
Turkish people of Ukrainian descent